A City Called Copenhagen is a 1960 Danish short documentary film directed by Jørgen Roos. It was nominated for an Academy Award for Best Documentary Short. The film received positive reception.

Synopsis
The film documents Copenhagen which includes its buildings, sights, and citizens.

Production
It took a long time to commission and fund the film, which is referenced in the film and is "an example of its use of humour". The film was produced using Eastmancolor film stock. The group that commissioned the production disliked the content which resulted in it not being released until two years later, but it received positive reception upon release. The film's success gave Roos more opportunities to produce films within more countries. Similar to the director's next two films, A City Called Copenhagen has to do with the lives of citizens and walking throughout the city. The film's producers are the National Film Board, with sponsorships by the City Council of Copenhagen along with the Port of Copenhagen Authority. It was released by Brandon Films and Minerva Films in colour. Clive Bayliss is the English narrator and Bill Caldwell is the American narrator.

Reception
The Santa Ynez Valley News said that the film "is a self ironic masterpiece; a genuine and informal picture of the Danish capital with emphasis on the picturesque features of every day life in the street, at the waterfront and in merry Tivoli, the gayest spot in Europe."

It gained second place at the Cannes Film Festival in 1960. In 1961, the film was nominated for an Academy Award for "Distinctive achievement in documentary production (short subjects)".

References

External links

Watch En by ved navn København at the Danish Film Institute

1960 films
1960 in Denmark
1960 documentary films
1960s short documentary films
1960s Danish-language films
Danish short documentary films
Documentary films about cities
Arts in Copenhagen
History of Copenhagen